David Parland (26 September 1970 – 19 March 2013) was a Swedish metal guitarist, best known for his work in the bands Dark Funeral, Necrophobic and Infernal, all of which he was one of the founding members.

Biography
He was a member of Necrophobic from its inception in 1989, but quit the band in 1995 to concentrate on Dark Funeral, which he was one of the main founding members of in 1993. Prior to leaving Necrophobic, he had, however, written most of the material for the next album. The album  Darkside, with Parland's material intact, was released by Necrophobic in 1997, although Parland himself did not participate as a musician on the album.

Parland also ran the independent record label Hellspawn Records (also Hellspawn Studio) from 1994 to 2002 in Johanneshov, Stockholm, releasing albums from bands such as Abruptum and his own Dark Funeral, with distribution by House of Kicks, VME and Sound Pollution. After leaving Dark Funeral in 1996, Parland founded the bands War and Infernal. While having kept a low profile and not being actively involved in any bands since the second line-up of Infernal broke up in 2003, Parland announced in January 2009 that he was working on new material with drummer Tomas Asklund (Gorgoroth, Dissection, ex-Dark Funeral). Demos and a full-length album were to be recorded during 2009. An EP from the band was finally released on May 1, 2010, entitled The Infernal Return.

In an interview from October 2012, David Parland explained the reasons why Infernal went inactive right after the new EP, which included bad financial circumstances, Parland getting arrested, and being sent to a psychiatric district for "detoxification purposes". According to the interview, Parland got a neck injury in a car crash several years before and only resorted to using painkillers. He eventually became addicted. Also, Parland revealed that Infernal had parted ways for good with drummer Tomas Asklund. Parland was planning on searching for a pro-black/death/heavy metal drummer for the recording of the long planned and long-awaited full-length The Infernal Retribution. The album was intended to be released in late 2013, according to this interview.

Infernal never recorded the long-awaited full-length album and was ultimately terminated. On March 19, 2013, at the age of 42, David Parland died by suicide. In reaction to the news of Parland's death, former bandmate Lord Ahriman said, "During the last couple of weeks, I was in close contact with David. He was going through an extremely difficult time of life, whereof he contacted me to ask for my help. Even though the two of us had a bit of a complicated relationship over the years (much excessive in the media though), he knew that he could ALWAYS call or visit me when needed, which he also did once in a while. Last time I talked to him was when he called me on March 15. From what I could understand, things were going in the right direction... What happened after that I simply can't understand... I cant understand WHY he didn't call me [again.]"

Beliefs
He was a self-described misanthrope and harbored contempt for organized religion and "political correctness", as well as "slave mentality" and other mindsets which oppose individualism. He agreed with many aspects of Satanic thought, but did not consider himself religious.

Bands
Necrophobic guitar - (1989-1995, 2000) keyboards (1993)
Dark Funeral guitar - (1993-1996)
Infernal bass, guitar, vocals - (1997-2003, 2008–2013)
Darkwinds (formerly called Blackmoon) all instruments, vocals - (2009-2013)

Discography

Infernal
 Infernal (EP) (2000) (Hellspawn Records)
 Under Wings of Hell (split) (2002)
 Summon Forth the Beast (EP) (2003) (Hammerheart Records)
 The Infernal Return (EP) (2010) (GoatHorned Productions)

Unreleased recordings
 Hellhymns, 4-track demo (autumn 2010; to be released by Hellspawn)
 The Infernal Return

Darkwinds
Demo (unreleased demo) (1994) (as Blackmoon)
Demo (2009)
Untitled album (2010)

Necrophobic
Slow Asphyxiation (1990) (demo)
Unholy Prophecies (1991) (demo)
The Call (EP) (1992) (Wild Rags Records)
The Nocturnal Silence (1993) (Black Mark Production)
Bloodfreezing (1994) (unreleased demo). Now available for download
Spawned by Evil (MCD) (1996) (Black Mark Production)
Satanic Blasphemies (2010) (Regain Records) (Special CD box set with the two first demos and the first EP)

Dark Funeral
Dark Funeral (EP) (1994) (Hellspawn Records)
The Secrets of the Black Arts (1996) (No Fashion Records)
In the Sign... (2000) (Hellspawn Records) (re-release of the self-titled 1994 MCD with 2 Bathory covers as bonus tracks)

War
Total War (1996/1997) (Necropolis Records)
We Are...Total War... (2001) (Hellspawn Records) (compilation CD including ’’Total War’’ and 7 tracks from the unofficial "We Are War" album/session released by Necropolis Records)

Hellspawn Records releases
Dark Funeral – Dark Funeral (EP) (1994)
Abruptum – Evil Genius (1995)
Von – Satanic Blood (1996/97)
In Conspiracy with Satan – A Tribute to Bathory (1998) (with No Fashion Records)
Infernal – Infernal (MCD) (2000)
Dark Funeral – In the Sign... (2000)
Tyrants from the Abyss – Morbid Angel Tribute (2002)
Deathwitch – Deathfuck Rituals (2002)
Maze of Torment – The Unmarked Graves (2003)

References

External links
Swipnet.se (old website)
Official Infernal MySpace profile
Official Darkwinds MySpace profile

Black metal musicians
Swedish heavy metal guitarists
1970 births
2013 suicides
Dark Funeral members
Suicides in Sweden
Critics of religions